Adesmus sexguttatus is a species of beetle in the family Cerambycidae. It was described by Hippolyte Lucas in 1857. It is known from Argentina and Brazil.

References

Adesmus
Beetles described in 1857